Ben 10: Omniverse 2 is an action video game based on the American animated series of the same name and is the sequel to Ben 10: Omniverse. The game was published by D3 Publisher in November 2013 for PlayStation 3, Xbox 360, Wii, Nintendo 3DS and Wii U. The game was given negative reviews.

Overview 
Ben 10: Omniverse 2 alternates between 2 styles of gameplay throughout its campaign, melee combat and auto runner sections.

Reception

The game received negative reviews with a Metacritic score of 33 on PS3, based on 4 reviews.

References

External links

2013 video games
Ben 10
D3 Publisher games
Video games based on Ben 10
Nintendo 3DS games
Nintendo 3DS eShop games
PlayStation 3 games
Bandai Namco games
Video games developed in the United States
Video games scored by Adam Gubman
Video games set in the United States
Video games scored by Rod Abernethy
Wii games
Xbox 360 games
Wii U games
Wii U eShop games
Superhero video games
High Voltage Software games
Single-player video games
3D beat 'em ups
Cartoon Network video games
1st Playable Productions games